Tamara Lees (14 December 1924 – 22 December 1999), born as, Diana Helena Tamara Mapplebeck was an Austrian-born English film actress. She appeared in 48 films between 1947 and 1961.

Selected filmography

 While the Sun Shines (1947)
 Bond Street (1948)
 A Piece of Cake (1948)
 Stop Press Girl (1949)
 Marry Me (1949)
 Trottie True (1949)
 Her Favourite Husband (1950)
 Romanticismo (1950)
 Toto the Sheik (1950)
 A Dog's Life (1950)
 Filumena Marturano (1951)
 Song of Spring (1951)
 Four Ways Out (1951)
 Frontier Wolf (1952)
 The Phantom Musketeer (1952)
 Beauties in Capri (1952)
 The Piano Tuner Has Arrived (1952)
 Verginità (1952)
 Il tallone di Achille (1952)
 Girls Marked Danger (1952)
 Noi peccatori (1953)
 Frine, Courtesan of Orient (1953)
 Perdonami! (1953)
 Queen of Babylon (1954)
 The Contessa's Secret (1954)
 Songs of Italy (1955)
 Goodbye Naples (1955)
 Beautiful But Dangerous (1955)
 Three Strangers in Rome (1958) 
 Sword in the Shadows (1961)

References

External links

1924 births
1999 deaths
English film actresses
Actresses from Vienna
20th-century English actresses
Austrian emigrants to the United Kingdom